Spyder's Web was a British crime drama television series produced by ATV for ITV and broadcast in 1972. It starred Anthony Ainley as Clive Hawksworth and Patricia Cutts as Charlotte "Lottie" Dean as two secret agents working for the mysterious Spyder organisation in the interests of the British government.

Overview
In common with many other such series of the time, Spyder's Web adopted an ironic approach to its subject matter. The Spyder organisation used as its cover a down-at-heel film company, Arachnid Films, and only Dean and Hawksworth were in on the secret; the company's other employees, Wallis Ackroyd and Albert Mason, believed the cover to be genuine. Indeed, Dean claimed to have won awards for her documentaries. Hawksworth, the "action man," was a knowing caricature of the steely-eyed, jutting-jawed heroes of former times, and was alleged to have been "steeped in Bulldog Drummond from an early age." (His response: "We were just good friends.") Five of the thirteen episodes were written by Roy Clarke, who created Last of the Summer Wine. The programme ran for just one series.

Home media
The series was released on DVD by Network in 2011; eleven of the episodes do not survive in colour.

Cast
 Patricia Cutts – Lottie Dean
 Veronica Carlson – Wallis Ackroyd
 Anthony Ainley – Clive Hawksworth
 Roger Lloyd-Pack – Albert Mason

Episode list

References

External links
 
 Spyder's Web episodes ranked from worst to best

1972 British television series debuts
1972 British television series endings
1970s British drama television series
ITV television dramas
1970s British crime television series
Espionage television series
1970s British television miniseries
Television shows produced by Associated Television (ATV)
Television series by ITV Studios
English-language television shows